Tillandsia macrochlamys is a species of flowering plant in the Bromeliaceae family. This species is endemic to Mexico.

References

macrochlamys
Flora of Mexico
Taxa named by John Gilbert Baker